Down Came a Blackbird is a 1953 comedy play  by the British writer Peter Blackmore. It was first staged at Q Theatre in London before transferring to the West End where it ran for 53 performances at the Savoy Theatre between 22 December 1953 and 6 February 1954. Directed by Henry Kendall the cast included Peter Arne, Viola Keats, John Loder and Betty Paul. The title is taken from a line in the traditional nursery rhyme Sing a Song of Sixpence. It takes place entirely in the garden room of the Egyptian villa of Sir Clive Dawson.

References

Bibliography
 Wearing, J.P. The London Stage 1950–1959: A Calendar of Productions, Performers, and Personnel.  Rowman & Littlefield, 2014.

1953 plays]
British plays
Comedy plays
Plays set in Egypt
West End plays